Byron Lambert "Consuello" "Crook" Smith (March 21, 1899 – March 3, 1990) was an American college football, baseball,  and basketball player and coach inducted into the Georgia Sports Hall of Fame in 1979. He played for Mercer, and, after a short career as a baseball player and umpire in professional baseball, he was the head coach for the Georgia Southern Eagles team of Georgia Southern University (then known as Georgia Teacher's College). He was later assistant pastor and director of young people's work at Immanuel Baptist Church in Savannah.

University of Georgia coach Herman Stegeman said Smith during his playing days was "without a doubt the best all-around athlete of the South."

Mercer University
Smith was from Fayetteville. He earned 13 letters in football, baseball, basketball, and track  for the Mercer Bears. He was inducted into the Mercer Athletics Hall of Fame in its inaugural year of 1971. "Crook" was the older brother of Phoney Smith.

Football
Smith was a prominent end on the football team.

1922
He was selected All-Southern.

1923
He was selected All-Southern by Julian Leggett of the Macon News.

Basketball
In basketball he was a forward, and was selected All-Southern. He was captain of the basketball team. He played alongside George Harmon and Bob Gamble.  Their team was the runner-up to North Carolina in the 1922 SoCon Tournament.

Coaching career

Georgia Southern
Smith coached the Georgia Southern Eagles team of Georgia Southern University (then known as Georgia Teacher's College) from 1929 to 1942. His basketball teams compiled a 116–60 record. His 1937 football team lost the first game played in the Orange Bowl. His 1939 football team won the Bacardi Bowl.

Head coaching record

Football

References

External links
 

1899 births
1990 deaths
American football ends
American men's basketball players
Basketball coaches from Tennessee
Georgia Southern Eagles baseball coaches
Georgia Southern Eagles football coaches
Georgia Southern Eagles men's basketball coaches
Mercer Bears baseball players
Mercer Bears football players
Mercer Bears men's basketball players
College men's track and field athletes in the United States
All-Southern college football players
People from Fayetteville, Tennessee
Coaches of American football from Tennessee
Players of American football from Tennessee
Baseball coaches from Tennessee
Forwards (basketball)